Lani Kai (born George Clarence Dennis James Von Ruckleman Woodd III; August 15, 1936 – August 29, 1999) was a Hawaiian singer and actor. He had a role in the Elvis Presley film Blue Hawaii and was a regular cast member of the television series Adventures in Paradise.

Background
Kai was born  in Honolulu, Hawaii. He was brother of Lee Woodd, and the half brother of Kalai Strode and Junelehua Robertson. His mother Lukia Luana, a Hawaiian princess was married to actor Woody Strode. His brother Lee Woodd, who was also an actor, died on 19 September 2002.

Death
He died  on August 29 1999 at a North Shore home of a friend, two weeks after his 63rd birthday.

Music career
Kai got an early break on the Don Sherwood Show in San Francisco, California.
In late 1959, his single "Now There Are None" / "Isle Of No Aloha" was released. In 1963, his album Island Love Songs was released. In November 1968, he was appearing live at the Hawaii-Five-O club with Al Lopaka and Nephi Hannemann.

In 1968, he had a single released on Don Ho's Hana Ho label.

In the late 1990s, he was working on an album with actor / singer Nephi Hannemann which was to be a follow up to Hannemann's album The Polynesian Man but Kai died before it could come together.

Compositions
His composition "Puka Shells" which was recorded by Rod Young made it to no 2 in the Hawaiian music charts in the mid-1970s. He also co-composed "The Poor People" with Cliff Muller. Another composition "Shells" was recorded by Keola Beamer and included on his album for George Winston's Dancing Cat Records, Wooden Boat album.

Lani Kai discography

Film and television career
When he was 24 years old, he was picked for the television series Adventures in Paradise. He ended up with a role as Kelly the series from 1960-1962. He had also played the part of Carl Tanami in the 1961 film Blue Hawaii.  Between the late 60s and early 70s, he appeared in a few Hawaii Five-O episodes. In one the episode The Joker's Wild, Man, Wild!, he played the part of Billy Hona. It also starred Beverlee McKinsey.

Filmography

Feature film
 Blue Hawaii (1961) - Carl Tanami
 The Late Liz (1971) - Manu (final film role)

Television
 Adventures in Paradise - Episode:  The Forbidden Sea -  Khobu - (1 episode) (1960)
 Adventures in Paradise - Episodes: Various -  Kelly Katimakaka,  Kelly Kelimanaha, Kelly (26 episodes) (1960–1962)
 Hawaiian Eye - Episode: Go for Baroque - Johnny (1 episode) (1963)
 Hawaii Five-O - Episode: Yesterday Died and Tomorrow Won't Be Born -  M.K. (1968)
 Hawaii Five-O - Episode: The Joker's Wild, Man, Wild! - Billy (1969)
 Hawaii Five-O - Episode: Most Likely to Murder - Lonnie Kahekili (1970)

References

External links
 

Male actors from Hawaii
Songwriters from Hawaii
Male actors from Honolulu
Hawaiian songwriters
Musicians from Honolulu
Native Hawaiian musicians
20th-century American singers
Native Hawaiian people
1936 births
1999 deaths